is a Japanese skeleton racer. He was a participant at the 2014 Winter Olympics in Sochi.

References

1994 births
Skeleton racers at the 2014 Winter Olympics
Living people
Olympic skeleton racers of Japan
Japanese male skeleton racers
Place of birth missing (living people)
20th-century Japanese people
21st-century Japanese people